Dixon McRae Ward (born September 23, 1968) is a Canadian former National Hockey League right wing.  He was drafted in the seventh round, 128th overall, by the Vancouver Canucks in the 1988 NHL Entry Draft.

Career
Ward is the only North Dakota Fighting Sioux player to record 100 goals and 100 assists for his career. After playing four seasons with the University of North Dakota, Ward joined the Canucks for the 1992–93 season.  Ward spent short periods of time with the Canucks, Los Angeles Kings, and Toronto Maple Leafs before joining the Buffalo Sabres, with whom he had his greatest success.  Ward played four full seasons with the Sabres, including 1998–99 when he scored 20 goals in the regular season and 7 more during the team's run to the Stanley Cup finals. Ward later played one season each with the Boston Bruins and the New York Rangers after which he retired in 2003.  In his NHL career, Ward appeared in 537 games, scoring 95 goals and adding 129 assists.  He also appeared in 62 playoff games, scoring 14 goals and recording 20 assists.

As of 2010, Ward is a VP with the Okanagan Hockey School in Penticton, BC.

Awards and honors

Jack A. Butterfield Trophy (most valuable player in Calder Cup (American Hockey League) playoffs): 1995–96 season
Calder Cup champion with the Rochester Americans in the 1995–96 season.

Career statistics

External links

1968 births
Living people
Boston Bruins players
Buffalo Sabres players
Canadian ice hockey right wingers
Detroit Vipers players
Hartford Wolf Pack players
Ice hockey people from Alberta
Los Angeles Kings players
New York Rangers players
North Dakota Fighting Hawks men's ice hockey players
People from Leduc, Alberta
Red Deer Rustlers players
Rochester Americans players
SC Rapperswil-Jona Lakers players
SCL Tigers players
St. John's Maple Leafs players
Toronto Maple Leafs players
Vancouver Canucks draft picks
Vancouver Canucks players